Krzysztof Starnawski (born 1968) is a Polish technical and cave diver and International Association of Nitrox and Technical Divers (IANTD), Confédération Mondiale des Activités Subaquatiques (CMAS), French Federation of Speleology (FFS) diving instructor.

Dive equipment 
Dual HammerHead rebreather of his own design.

Dive record 
On 3 December 2011 Krzysztof Starnawski broke David Shaw's record in deep diving with a rebreather. The record-breaking dive to  took place in Dahab, Egypt.

See also 
 Deep diving
 Cave diving
 Technical diving

References 

1968 births
Living people
Cave diving explorers
Place of birth missing (living people)
Polish explorers
Polish underwater divers